The Rosh HaNikra Crossing also known as Ras Al Naqoura Crossing is an international border crossing between Naqoura, Lebanon and Rosh HaNikra, Israel. The terminal is operated solely by the United Nations Interim Force in Lebanon and the Israel Defense Forces. The passage of regular tourists/visitors is forbidden.

Use
The crossing has been used twice during the summation of negotiations between Israel and Hezbollah. On 16 July 2008 it was used by Israel to send Samir Kuntar back to Lebanon and for Hezbollah to return the bodies of Israeli soldiers Eldad Regev and Ehud Goldwasser.

After the release of passengers and crew from the Gaza Flotilla Raid, Israel deported four Lebanese activists via the crossing on 3 June 2010. Abbas Nasser, Hussein Shukur, Andre Abi Khalil and Hani Suleiman crossed the border at about 10.30 pm where they were met by a huge crowd, waving the Lebanese, Palestinian and Turkish flags and throwing rice and flowers.

Border incident
On December 15, 2013, an Israeli soldier was shot and killed by a rogue Lebanese soldier.

References

Israel–Lebanon border crossings